The 1906 New York state election was held on November 6, 1906, to elect the governor, the lieutenant governor, the Secretary of State, the state comptroller, the attorney general, the state treasurer and the state engineer, as well as all members of the New York State Assembly and the New York State Senate.

History
The Socialist state convention met on June 2 at the Workingmen's Educational Building at 247, East Eighty-fourth Street in New York City. Morris Hillquit was chosen Permanent Chairman. They nominated John C. Chase for governor; Gustave Adolph Strebel for lieutenant governor; Henry L. Slobodin, of New York City, for attorney general; William W. Arland, of Corning, for secretary of state; John E. O'Rourke, of Rochester, for comptroller; William W. Passage, of Brooklyn, for treasurer; and R. R. Hunt, of Schenectady, for state engineer.

The Prohibition state convention met on September 5 at Binghamton, New York. They nominated Capt. Henry M. Randall, of Port Jefferson, for governor; Freeman H. Bettys, of Rochester, for lieutenant governor; Charles Richards, of Oswego, for secretary of state; Levi Hoag, of Binghamton, for comptroller; Robert L. Stokes, of Brooklyn, for treasurer; Walter Farrington for attorney general; and Victor C. Mott, of Buffalo, for state engineer.

The Independence League state convention met on September 11 and 12 at Carnegie Hall in New York City. They nominated William Randolph Hearst for governor; Lewis S. Chanler for lieutenant governor; John S. Whalen for secretary of state; John Ford for attorney general; Dr. C. H. W. Auel for comptroller; Frank L. Getman for state engineer; and did not nominate anybody for treasurer. After the nomination of Hearst, Chanler and Whalen by the Democratic state convention, the other nominees retired, and on September 29, the Independence League's Executive Committee substituted the Democratic nominees Jackson, Glynn, and Skene on the ticket, and added Hauser for treasurer.

The Republican state convention met on September 25 and 26 at Saratoga Springs, New York. Boss Benjamin B. Odell, Jr. favored Ex-Governor Frank S. Black, Governor Frank W. Higgins favored his Lt. Gov. Bruce, but after the intervention of President Theodore Roosevelt, the convention nominated Charles E. Hughes for governor. Merton E. Lewis was nominated for comptroller, and all the other incumbent state officers were re-nominated, all by acclamation.

The Democratic state convention met on September 25, 26 and 27 at Buffalo, New York. Lewis Nixon was Temporary and Permanent Chairman. William Randolph Hearst was nominated for governor on the first ballot (vote: Hearst 309, William Sulzer 124, John Alden Dix 17). All other candidates were nominated by acclamation, among them the Independence League nominees Chanler and Whalen.

Result
The Democratic/Independence League fusion ticket was elected with exception of Hearst who was rejected by a large part of the Democratic voters, especially in New York City. Although Republican Hughes was elected governor, this election ended a Republican era in state politics which had lasted a dozen years.

The incumbents Bruce, O'Brien, Mayer, Wallenmeier and Van Alstyne were defeated.

The Republican, Democratic, Socialist and Prohibition parties maintained automatic ballot status (necessary 10,000 votes), the Independence League attained it, and the Socialist Labor Party did not re-attain it.

Obs.: 
 "Blank, defective and scattering" votes: 2,110 (Governor)
 "Blank, defective and scattering" votes: 2,468 (Lieutenant Governor)

Notes

Sources
How some voters marked the ballots: QUEER THINGS FOUND IN THE VOTE CANVASS; Inconceivable Ignorance of What to Do with a Ballot in NYT on November 17, 1906
Result: HEARST LEAGUE FAILS TO GET PARTY RANK in NYT on December 19, 1906
Campaign cost statements: CAMPAIGN STATEMENTS FAIL TO STATE ALL in NYT on November 30, 1906
Result: The Tribune Almanac 1907
New York Red Book 1908

Further reading
 Johnston, Charles. "Charles Evans Hughes: And the Contest in New York State." The North American Review 183.602 (1906): 897-905. online
 McCormick, Richard L. From Realignment to Reform: Political Change in New York State 1893-1910 (Cornell University Press, 1981).
 Procter, Ben H. William Randolph Hearst: the early years, 1863-1910. Vol. 1 (Oxford UP, 1998).
 Wesser, Robert F. Charles Evans Hughes: Politics and Reform in New York, 1905-1910 (Cornell UP, 2009).
 Wesser, Robert F. "Theodore Roosevelt: Reform and Reorganization of the Republican Party in New York, 1901-1906." New York History 46.3 (1965): 230-252 online.

See also
New York gubernatorial elections

1906
1906 New York (state) elections